A cantonment board is a civic administration body in India under control of the Ministry of Defence. The board comprises elected members besides ex-officio and nominated members as per the Cantonments Act, 2006. The term of office of a member of a board is five years. A cantonment board consists of eight elected members, three nominated military members, three ex-officio members (station commander, garrison engineer and senior executive medical officer), and one representative of the district magistrate.

There are 62 Cantonment Boards in India, managed by Directorate General Defence Estates (DGDE).

Cantonments are divided into four categories, namely,
 Category I – population exceeds fifty thousand
 Category II – population exceeds ten thousand, but does not exceed fifty thousand
 Category III – population exceeds two thousand five hundred, but does not exceed ten thousand
 Category IV – population does not exceed two thousand five hundred.

Ministry of Defence has recommended abolishing the DGDE, and redistributing its functions among the armed forces and other audit bodies.

Functions 
The cantonment board takes care of mandatory duties such as provision of public health, water supply, sanitation, primary education, and street lighting etc. As the resources are owned by government of India, it can't levy any tax. Government of India provides the financial assistance.

It is the duty of the president of the cantonment board:
 unless prevented by reasonable cause, to convene and preside at all meetings of the board and to regulate the conduct of business;
 to control, direct and supervise the financial and executive administration of the board;
 to perform all the duties and exercise all the powers specially imposed or conferred on the president by or under this act; and
 subject to any restrictions, limitations and conditions imposed by this Act, to exercise executive power for the purpose of carrying out the provisions of this Act.
 in case of gross misconduct during the course of meeting, to suspend a member other than a chief executive officer from attending the un-conduct part of the meeting of the Board.

List of cantonment boards

North 

Himachal Pradesh
 Bakloh (near Chamba)
 Dagshai (near Solan)
 Dalhousie
 Jutogh (near Shimla)
 Kasauli
 Sabathu (near Solan)
 Yol (near Dharamshala)

Jammu and Kashmir
 Badami Bagh (near Srinagar)
 Jammu

North-West 

Delhi
 Delhi

Haryana
 Ambala

Punjab
 Amritsar
 Firozpur
 Jalandhar

Rajasthan
 Ajmer
 Nasirabad (near Ajmer)
 Jaipur

North-Central 

Uttarakhand
 Almora
 Chakrata
 Clement Town (near Dehradun)
 Dehradun
 Landour (near Mussoorie)
 Lansdowne
 Nainital
 Ranikhet
 Roorkee

Central 

Madhya Pradesh
 Jabalpur
 Mhow
 Morar
 Pachmarhi
 Sagar

Uttar Pradesh
 Agra
 Allahabad
 Ayodhya
 Babina (near Jhansi)
 Bareilly
 Jhansi
 Kanpur
 Lucknow
 Fatehgarh
 Mathura
 Meerut
 Shahjahanpur
 Varanasi

West 

Gujarat
 Ahmedabad

Maharashtra
 Ahmednagar
 Aurangabad
 Dehu Road (in Pune)
 Deolali (near Nashik)
 Kamptee (near Nagpur)
 Khadki (in Pune)
 Camp (in Pune)

East 

Bihar
 Danapur

Jharkhand
 Ramgarh

Meghalaya
 Shillong

West Bengal
 Barrackpur
 Dum Dum
 Jalapahar (in Darjeeling)
 Lebong (in Darjeeling)

South 

Karnataka
 Belgaum

Kerala
 Kannur

Tamil Nadu
 St.Thomas Mount-cum-Pallavaram (in Chennai)
 Wellington

Telangana
 Secunderabad

References 

 
Local government in India